Bucket! is an album by American jazz organist Jimmy Smith featuring performances recorded in 1963 but not released on the Blue Note label until 1966. The CD reissue added two tracks recorded at the same session as bonus tracks.

Reception
The Allmusic review by Stephen Thomas Erlewine awarded the album 3 calling it:

Track listing
All compositions by Jimmy Smith except as indicated
 "Bucket" – 4:43
 "Careless Love" (W.C. Handy, Martha E. Koenig, Spencer Williams) – 3:53
 "3 for 4" – 4:49
 "Just Squeeze Me (But Please Don't Tease Me)" (Duke Ellington, Lee Gaines) – 5:44
 "Sassy Mae" – 4:20
 "Come Rain or Come Shine" (Harold Arlen, Johnny Mercer) – 5:47
 "John Brown's Body" (Traditional) – 6:21

Bonus tracks on 2000 CD reissue
 "Trouble in Mind" (Richard M. Jones) – 5:39 
 "Sassy Mae" [alternate take] – 3:52 
Recorded at Rudy Van Gelder Studio in Englewood Cliffs, New Jersey on February 1, 1963

Personnel

Musicians
 Jimmy Smith – organ
 Quentin Warren – guitar
 Donald Bailey – drums

Technical
 Alfred Lion – producer
 Rudy Van Gelder – engineer
 Reid Miles – cover design
 Jean-Pierre Leloir – photography
 Leonard Feather – liner notes

References

Blue Note Records albums
Jimmy Smith (musician) albums
1966 albums
Albums recorded at Van Gelder Studio
Albums produced by Alfred Lion